Duberria is a genus of snakes of the family Pseudoxyrhophiidae.

Species
 Duberria lutrix (Linnaeus, 1758)
 Duberria rhodesiana (Broadley, 1958)
 Duberria shirana (Boulenger, 1894)
 Duberria variegata (Peters, 1854)

References

Snake genera
Pseudoxyrhophiidae